The Unusual Youth is a 2005 Hong Kong teen comedy-drama film centering on five disillusioned Hong Kong teenagers living on the island of Cheung Chau as they try to deal with life in spite of family backgrounds. The film stars Race Wong of 2R fame, Yan Ng, Marco Lok and Raymond Wong. Several veteran Milkyway Image actors, which include Law Wing-Cheong, Cheung Siu-Fai, Lam Suet and Simon Yam (in a brief, unbilled appearance) make cameo appearances.

The Unusual Youth marks the writing and directing debut of Dennis Law, a former real-estate developer turned former chairman for Milkyway Image. It is also the first film to be produced by Law's own production company Point of View Movie Production Co. Ltd.

Cast
 Race Wong as Suki
 Yan Ng as May May
 Marco Lok as Leung Guy-Cheung, a.k.a. Big Chick
 Raymond Wong Ho-Yin as Biggie
 Helena Law as Grandma
 Kitty Yuen as Siu Yiu
 Sammy Leung as Sai Hung
 Lam Suet as Uncle Hong
 Cheung Siu-Fai as Kwok Sir
 Law Wing-Cheong as Inspector Lam
 Johnny Lu as Big Shot
 Simon Yam as Police Superintendent (uncredited)

External links
 
 The Unusual Youth @ HKMDB.com
 HK cinemagic entry

2005 films
Hong Kong comedy-drama films
2000s Cantonese-language films
China Star Entertainment Group films
Films directed by Dennis Law
2000s Hong Kong films